Institut français is located in Maxvorstadt, Munich, Bavaria, Germany.

Buildings and structures in Munich
Maxvorstadt

fr:Institut français d'Allemagne#Les_onze_Instituts_français_et_les_trois_antennes_culturelles